El Ideal Gallego is a Galician newspaper from A Coruña, Spain.

History and profile
El Ideal Gallego was first published in A Coruña on  1 April 1917. Its founder was José Toubes Pego. The paper was fined 10,000 pesetas in 1971 for
not obeying by the law of press and printing.

In 1999, El Ideal Gallego acquired El Diario de Ferrol becoming its editor and moving their headquarters to the City Port and Naval Station of Ferrol, which like A Coruña, also lies in Galicia.

References

External links 

1917 establishments in Spain
Mass media in Galicia (Spain)
Mass media in A Coruña
Daily newspapers published in Spain
Publications established in 1917
Spanish-language newspapers